Anoplodesmus saussurii is a species of millipedes in the family Paradoxosomatidae. It was once thought endemic to Sri Lanka, but it was later found in Fiji and Mauritius.

Description
It is about 21–33 mm in length. Adults are shiny dark brown to black in color. They are much largely aggregated species that can be found undercover of decaying litter layers in the agricultural and horticultural land areas and forests on humid soils. Mainly herbivores, they are known to eat any decaying and rotting leaves and vegetable parts, and even wood, decaying fish, and cow dung. After 20 to 25 days of copulation, female laid 200 to 400 eggs in earthen nests. One female may lay 2 to 4 times of egg masses in her lifetime. After seven moultings, stadia come out to surface after the onset of the rainy season.

References

Polydesmida
Animals described in 1865